is a 2015 Japanese music youth drama film directed by Nobuhiro Yamashita. It was released on February 14, 2015.

Cast
Subaru Shibutani
Fumi Nikaidō

Reception
The film has grossed  at the Japanese box office.

Awards
Fantasia International Film Festival 2015 - Best actor(Subaru Shibutani), Best screenwriter(Tomoe Kanno)

References

External links
 

Films directed by Nobuhiro Yamashita
Japanese drama films
2015 drama films
2015 films
2010s Japanese films
2010s Japanese-language films